Privileged is an American comedy-drama television series that premiered on The CW in the United States and City in Canada from September 9, 2008. The series stars JoAnna Garcia and is based on the 2008 Alloy Entertainment book How to Teach Filthy Rich Girls by Zoey Dean. The series was originally to share the same name as the book, but the name was announced at the upfronts as Surviving the Filthy Rich and later changed again to Privileged on June 24, 2008. It was produced by Alloy Entertainment in association with Warner Bros. Television with executive producers Rina Mimoun, Bob Levy and Leslie Morgenstein. Michael Engler directed the pilot.

On May 19, 2009, The CW cancelled the series of Privileged after one season.

Plot
Twenty-three-year-old Megan Smith (JoAnna Garcia) has a Yale education, a relentlessly positive attitude, and a plan to conquer the world of journalism, despite the fact that she is slaving away at a tabloid rag. Megan's plan is thrown off course when, in one whirlwind day, she gets fired, meets cosmetics mogul Laurel Limoges (Anne Archer), and becomes the live-in tutor for Laurel's twin teen granddaughters in heady Palm Beach, Florida, a world of wealth and power. The girls, Rose (Lucy Hale) and Sage (Ashley Newbrough), are beautiful, rebellious, and less-than-thrilled with their new tutor, but Megan is determined to win them over as she enjoys the perks of her new job: breathtaking private suite, gorgeous convertible, and live-in chef Marco (Allan Louis). Even the neighbors are fabulous in Palm Beach and Megan quickly catches the eye of Will (Brian Hallisay), the wealthy and attractive dilettante who lives on the estate next door and just happens to be dating Megan's estranged sister, Lily (Kristina Apgar). Completing this romantic quadrangle is Megan's best friend Charlie (Michael Cassidy), who is secretly in love with her. Despite her own complicated romantic and family relationships, Megan is committed to making a difference in the lives of her two headstrong charges as she navigates the treacherous waters of high society in Palm Beach.

Cast

 JoAnna Garcia as Megan Smith
 Lucy Hale as Rose Baker
 Ashley Newbrough as Sage Baker
 Michael Cassidy as Charlie Hogan
 Allan Louis as Marco Giordani
 Brian Hallisay as Will Davis
 Kristina Apgar as Lily Smith
 Anne Archer as Laurel Limoges

Episodes
The CW was pleased with the show's initial performance, and in November 2008, extended its original season on order by five episodes, bringing the episode total up to eighteen.

The show's original timeslot was Tuesdays at 9 p.m., where The CW aired the first ten episodes. The next two episodes of Privileged were tested in a new timeslot, on Mondays, December 1 and 8, 2008, at 9 p.m. However, those episodes were also rebroadcast the following night at 9 p.m./ET, in the show's usual time slot, and Privileged continued midseason in the same Tuesday timeslot beginning January 6, 2009. The first season ended with the caption "To be continued ..." However, on May 19, 2009, The CW announced that they would not be renewing Privileged for a second season.

Streaming
The series is available to stream on The CW's free digital-only network, CW Seed.

References

External links
 

2000s American comedy-drama television series
2000s American teen drama television series
2008 American television series debuts
2009 American television series endings
The CW original programming
English-language television shows
Mass media portrayals of the upper class
Television shows based on American novels
Television series by Alloy Entertainment
Television series by CBS Studios
Television series by Warner Bros. Television Studios
Television shows filmed in California
Television shows set in Florida